Dollard-des-Ormeaux (commonly referred to as D.D.O. or simply Dollard) is a predominantly English-speaking suburb of Montreal in southwestern Quebec, Canada. It is located on the Island of Montreal. The town was named after French martyr Adam Dollard des Ormeaux.

The town was merged with the city of Montreal in 2002, and became part of the borough of Dollard-Des Ormeaux–Roxboro.  When residents were later offered the option, they chose to leave the city of Montreal, and the town was reinstated as a separate entity in 2006.

Name
The orthography of the city's name has been adjusted periodically. Originally written as Dollard-des-Ormeaux, it became Dollard des Ormeaux (no hyphens) in 1960, and reverted again to the hyphenated spelling in 1969.

In 2001, the official Commission de toponymie du Québec ruled that the correct orthography of the city's name is Dollard-Des Ormeaux (one hyphen, one space, all title caps) due to the patronymic particle. However, this was not widely accepted, and is rarely used in practice. In particular, the city's own website did not use this way of writing the city's name. In 2022, the Commission officially reverted to the spelling Dollard-des-Ormeaux, which had been in use since 1924.

History

Early history 
In 1714, the area was part of the Parish of St-Joachim de Pointe-Claire. It became part of the Parish of Ste-Geneviève when it detached from Pointe-Claire in 1845.

On July 29, 1924, Dollard-des-Ormeaux detached from the Parish of Ste-Geneviève and became a separate municipality in response to a tax imposed by the Parish road improvements on Gouin Boulevard. Its first mayor was Hormidas Meloche.

The town's name honours the French martyr Adam Dollard des Ormeaux, who was killed by the Iroquois at Long Sault in 1660.

Later history 
The City of Dollard-des-Ormeaux obtained a new charter and was incorporated as a city on February 4, 1960.

Dollard-des-Ormeaux was originally a bedroom community in the early 1960s. The population was barely a few hundred in 1960, and within 10 years, exceeded 15,000.

One of its original main axes, Anselme-Lavigne Street in the Westpark neighbourhood, is named for a farmer who sold his land to the Belcourt Construction Company. Many of the streets in the Sunnydale neighbourhood, including "Sunshine" and "Hyman", are named for members in the prominent Zunenshine family who owned Belcourt. The community is a mixture of residential and commercial properties. Des Sources and St-Jean Boulevards are its main commercial arteries, and are represented by the two vertical lines in the city's official logo. The three circles in the logo, from left to right, respectively represent the St-Jean Sector, the Westpark Sector and the Sunnybrooke Sector. The three circles and two vertical lines in the logo represent the city's geography and artfully spell out "ddo".

The Town Hall was located in a house on Des Sources Boulevard in the early 1960s, and was moved to an 1806 French-Canadian farmhouse in 1964.

When Canada's centennial anniversary was due to occur, the town decided to create a "Centennial Park," featuring a man-made lake and hills. It was suggested to use this project for a reservoir for stormwater drainage, as the city was faced with the need to expand surface drainage pipes. The project was announced September 8, 1966. However the project ran into problems and became a local scandal and a major drain on resources. It was finally completed in the 1970s, albeit overdue and overbudget.

Dollard-des-Ormeaux was included in the Montreal Urban Community when that government was created in 1970.

Recent years 

On January 1, 2002, as part of the 2002–2006 municipal reorganization of Montreal, it merged with the city of Montreal and became part of the Dollard-Des Ormeaux–Roxboro borough. After a change of government and a 2004 demerger referendum, Dollard-des-Ormeaux was reconstituted as an independent city on January 1, 2006. It is now the Montreal Island's most populous city outside Montreal.

Albeit not served by the Montreal Metro, it is planned that the city would be served by the planned Réseau électrique métropolitain light rail system with at least one station at the juncture of Highway 40 and Des Sources Boulevard.

Demographics 

Parks and facilities

Dollard is known for its many well-attended green spaces, providing a park within one kilometre of each home. Notable parks include Centennial Park, Westminster Park, Frederick Wilson (Fredmir) Park, Baffin Park, and Terry Fox Park. Edward Janiszewski Park was named after the longest-reigning mayor of the city.

Dollard-des-Ormeaux is home to the Dollard Civic Centre, which serves as city hall, the public library, and houses ice skating and swimming facilities.

Sports

Dollard is home to many juvenile sports teams, including hockey, soccer, baseball, swimming, and ringette. In 2013, the city received $20 000 from Kraft Le Hockey Continue program in recognition of the efforts of Lance Taylor Townend, an administrator and coach with the Dollard Hockey Association.

Administration

The city administration
 Laurence Parent (District 1)
 Errol Johnson (District 2)
 Mickey Max Guttman (District 3)
 Tanya Toledano (District 4)
 Morris Vesely (District 5)
 Valérie Assouline (District 6)
 Ryan Brownstein (District 7)
 Anastasia Assimakopoulos (District 8)

Since the city's incorporation in 1960, there have been seven mayors. They are Alfred Labrosse (1960–1963), Frederick T. Wilson (1963–1968), Gerald Dephoure (1968–1978), Jean Cournoyer (1978–1982), Gerry Weiner (1982–1984), Edward Janiszewski (1984–2017) and Alex Bottausci (2017–present).

Edward Janiszewski's 33 years as Mayor of DDO makes him the longest-serving Mayor in the city's history, and the second longest-serving Mayor in the history of Canada, behind Hazel McCallion. He was first elected to the city council in 1978 before becoming mayor in 1984. During his tenure, he also oversaw the construction of Dollard-des-Ormeaux's famous library and many of the additions which were made to the civic centre. At the time of his defeat in 2017, the city was left with a surplus of $15 million.

Municipal Patrol 

Established in 1980, a municipal patrol service was initially created to enhance public safety in the city and to enforce parking violations after the merger of police departments on the Island of Montreal. The service is responsible for public safety, municipal by-law enforcement, crime prevention, emergency measures, and community relations.

List of mayors
List of mayors:

 Hormidas Meloche (1924–1925, 1927–1929)
 Joseph Paiement (1925–1927, 1957–1960)
 Daniel Chauret (1929–1933)
 Jean-Baptiste Aumais (1933–1939)
 Edmond Lavigne (1939–1942)
 Romain Jauron (1942–1945)
 Armand Labrosse (1945–1947)
 Joseph Cousineau (1947–1949)
 Anselme Lavigne (1949–1957)
 Alfred Labrosse (1960–1963)
 Frederick T. Wilson (1963–1968)
 R. Gérard Dephoure (1968–1978)
 Jean Cournoyer (1978–1982)
 Gerald Weiner (1982–1984)
 Edward Janisweski (1984–2002, 2006–2017)
 Alex Bottausci (2017–present)

Education
The Lester B. Pearson School Board operates four Anglophone public schools in the area. Schools operated by the LBPSB include Springdale Elementary School, Sunshine Academy, Westpark Elementary School, and Wilder Penfield Elementary School. Beechwood Elementary and Kingsdale Academy in Pierrefonds-Roxboro also serve portions of Dollard-des-Ormeaux.

The Centre de services scolaire Marguerite-Bourgeoys operates Francophone public schools, but were previously operated by the Commission scolaire Marguerite-Bourgeoys until June 15, 2020. The change was a result of a law passed by the Quebec government that changed the school board system from denominational to linguistic. Francophone public schools in the area includes École primaire Dollard-Des Ormeaux, the École primaire du Bois-de-Liesse, the École primaire Saint-Luc, and the École secondaire des Sources.

Private schools include West Island College, Emmanuel Christian School, and Hebrew Foundation School.

Notable residents

Goldie Hershon (1941–2020), activist and president of the Canadian Jewish Congress
Devon Levi (born 2001), ice hockey goaltender (Northeastern Huskies, Canada men's national junior ice hockey team)
Jaclyn Linetsky (1986–2003), actress
Adrien Plavsic (born 1970), NHL ice hockey defenceman 
Gerry Weiner (born 1933), politician, Mayor of Dollard-des-Ormeaux, Member of Parliament of Canada

See also 
 List of former boroughs of Montreal
 Montreal Merger
 Municipal reorganization in Quebec

References and notes

External links 

 Official site

 
Cities and towns in Quebec
Jewish communities in Canada
Jews and Judaism in Quebec
Island of Montreal municipalities